Rosa's Law is a United States law which replaced several instances of "mental retardation" in law with "intellectual disability". The bill was introduced as S.2781 in the United States Senate on November 17, 2009, by Barbara Mikulski (D-MD). It passed the Senate unanimously on August 5, 2010, then the House of Representatives on September 22, and was signed into law by President Barack Obama on October 5. The law is named for Rosa Marcellino, a girl with Down syndrome who was nine years old when it became law, and who, according to President Barack Obama, "worked with her parents and her siblings to have the words 'mentally retarded' officially removed from the health and education code in her home state of Maryland." 

Rosa's Law is part of a long line of changes that has been ongoing since the early 1900s.  Words such as idiot and moron were common in court documents and diagnosis throughout the early 1900s.  In the 1960s, changes in the law led to the use of such terms as mental retardation. With the loss of idiot (IQ 0–25), imbecile (IQ 26–50) and moron (IQ 51–75), specific descriptors of IQ-based intelligence were abandoned because of negative public sentiment. Under Rosa's law, these would be described respectively as profound, severe, and moderate levels of intellectual disability.

See also
Developmental disability
Feeble-minded
Intermediate Care Facilities for Individuals with Intellectual Disabilities
Intellectual disability
Qualified Intellectual Disability Professional

References

Acts of the 111th United States Congress
United States federal disability legislation
Intellectual disability